Arthur Bradley Wheat (26 October 1921 – 18 January 1986) was an English professional footballer who played as a half-back or as an inside forward in the Football League for Bradford Park Avenue and York City, and in Scotland for Montrose. His father, also called Arthur Wheat played county cricket for Nottinghamshire.

References

1921 births
1986 deaths
People from Selston
Footballers from Nottinghamshire
English footballers
Association football midfielders
Association football forwards
Montrose F.C. players
Bradford (Park Avenue) A.F.C. players
York City F.C. players
English Football League players